Árpád Székely was the Ambassador Extraordinary and Plenipotentiary of the Republic of Hungary to the Russian Federation.

See also 
 Embassy of Hungary in Moscow
 György Gilyán, the current Ambassador

References 

Hungarian diplomats
Year of birth missing (living people)
Living people
Ambassadors of Hungary to Russia